Tilža Parish is an administrative unit of Balvi Municipality in the Latgale region of Latvia (Before the 2009 reforms it was in Balvi District).

Balvi Municipality
Parishes of Latvia
Latgale